Peter N. Fedorov (born 1951) is a Ukrainian astronomer, specialist in astrometry and Galactic dynamics, known for his work on compiling the XPM star catalogue and determining the inertial coordinate system in the Milky Way. Head of the head of the Laboratory of Astrometry at Kharkiv Observatory, professor of the Department of Astronomy and Space Informatics at the V. N. Karazin Kharkiv National University. Winner of the Ye. P. Fedorov prize of the National Academy of Sciences of Ukraine for the series of works "Catalogues of stellar data as tools for astronomical research".

Biography 
In 1977, Peter N. Fedorov graduated from the School of Physics of Kharkiv State University (now V. N. Karazin Kharkiv National University). In 1977-1995, he worked at Mykolaiv Observatory. In 1986, he defended his PhD thesis "Lateral refraction in daytime observations".

Since 1981, Fedorov has been one of the managers of the Mountain Astronomical Station in the Caucasus. Under his command, the Struve-Ertel meridian instrument was installed, which was used for daytime observations of the Sun, Venus, and Mercury in 1981-1991.

Since 1995, Fedorov has been working at Kharkiv Observatory, as a senior researcher, acting head of department, head of department, head of the Laboratory of Astrometry. In 2012, he defended his doctoral thesis "XPM catalogue as an independent realization of the extragalactic reference frame in the optical and near-infrared wavebands". In the same year, he received the Ye. P. Fedorov award of the National Academy of Sciences of Ukraine. The prize is named after his namesake, astrometrist Yevgen Pavlovych Fedorov from Kyiv.

Since 2003, Fedorov has been teaching astrometry at the Department of Astronomy of Kharkiv University. Since 2004, he was an associate professor, and since 2013 he is a professor.

Honours and awards
 Ye. P. Fedorov award of the National Academy of Sciences of Ukraine for the series of works "Catalogues of stellar data as tools for astronomical research"(2012)

References

Sources 
 Peter N. Fedorov, Institute of Astronomy of Kharkiv University.
 Федоров Петро Миколайович, Фізичний факультет Харківського національного університету.

1952 births
Ukrainian astronomers
National University of Kharkiv alumni
Living people
Academic staff of Kharkiv Observatory